Boneh Var may refer to:
 Boneh Var, Lali, Khuzestan Province
 Boneh Var, Hati, Khuzestan Province
 Boneh Var, Lorestan